Dharmapuri Srinivas (born 27 September 1948) is an Indian politician, the former President of Andhra Pradesh Congress Party PCC and ex-MLA of the State Assembly. He was elected MLA three times in the years 1989,1999, and 2004. He served as Minister for Higher Education and Intermediate Education in Rajashekhar Reddy's government in 2009. Srinivas also worked with different portfolios in the State Cabinet of Andhra Pradesh. He played a key role to bring back the Congress Party into the government in 2004 and 2009. He is a nephew of former finance minister Argul Rajaram of A.P. State. Srinivas lost the elections in 2009, 2010 (By election) and 2012 to BJP and 2014 to TRS PARTY, respectively.

On 2 July 2015, he resigned from the INC
Party.

Early life
D. Srinivas was born in Nizamabad. He graduated from Nizam College, Hyderabad, Telangana.

Personal life
D. Srinivas is married and he has two sons. His elder son Sanjay is ex-Mayor of Nizamabad. His younger son Arvind Dharmapuri is a businessman and Member of Parliament of Nizamabad from Bharatiya Janata Party.

See also 

 Arvind Dharmapuri

References 

Telangana politicians
People from Telangana
Telugu politicians
Indian National Congress politicians from Telangana
Living people
People from Nizamabad district
1948 births
Leaders of the Opposition in Telangana
Telangana Rashtra Samithi politicians
Members of the Andhra Pradesh Legislative Council
Rajya Sabha members from Telangana
Indian National Congress politicians from Andhra Pradesh